Cheetah, also known as Cheetah and Friends, is a 1989 American family drama film from Walt Disney Pictures starring Keith Coogan and Lucy Deakins. This motion picture was loosely based on Alan Caillou's novel The Cheetahs. It was shot in Nairobi, Kenya. This motion picture features the phrase "Hakuna matata" which became famous when Disney released The Lion King five years later.

It was first screened alongside a re-issue of the 1948 animated short, Mickey and the Seal.

Plot
LA siblings Ted and Susan Johnson join their parents in Kenya where their father, Earl, works at a NASA tracking station, and their mother, Jean, works at a clinic. Ted’s dreams of roughing it on the Savannah are squashed when their mother leads him into a house that looks like it belongs in Pasadena, California. Although she forbids her children to explore, Ted and Susan sneak out to a nearby watering hole, where they meed a friendly Masai boy named Morogo. Morogo shows the siblings the wildlife of Kenya and they teach him how to play video games. One day, their mother comes home to discover Morogo in her home and they convince their parents that Morogo will keep them safe, which their parents reluctantly agree.

One day, Ted kicks a soccer ball over a barrier and it lands against a sleeping rhino. Morogo sneaks up on the animal, retrieves the ball, and places a small stone on the rhino’s side. He then gives Ted another stone, daring him to do the same. The rhino awakens as Ted nears, causing him to flee. Kipoin, Morogo’s father, scolds him for neglecting his goat herding duties and Morogo says that he will take care of his duties, but he has been learning new stuff from his friends, to which he detests about his new friends, because they are different.

One day, the trio comes across a cheetah cub whose mother has been killed by a poacher. Susan insists they take the cub home as it's the only way for her to survive and their parents reluctantly decide to keep her, where she becomes the household pet. Six months later, however, the Johnson family convince the children to free Duma and train her to hunt according to the advice of an Australian game warden named Larry before their vacation is over.

Meanwhile, an Indian storekeeper named B. Patel (who had unsuccessfully tried to buy Duma) hires an opportunistic Englishman named Nigel and a ruthless poacher named Abdullah, who are planning to make a fortune out of Duma by exploiting her speed in a prolific sport of racing against greyhounds. The night before Ted and Susan are to leave Africa, Patel breaks into the house to steal Ted's whistle and the three gamblers manage to capture Duma. The next morning, the family say goodbye to Morogo and stop at Patel's store. Patel accidentally reveals his whereabouts to Ted and he notices similar markings on Abdullah's shoes, indicating that he was the poacher who killed Duma's mother. Ted tries to convince his parents about Patel's conspiracy, to no avail, so the kids miss their flight after sending a telegram to their grandmother and learn Patel's whereabouts from his cousin that he is working in a camp in Jamhuri. The children convince Morogo to save Duma, but he fears that he can't go and gives them directions to Jamhuri. The next morning, Morogo sneaks away as well and decides to help them rescue Duma.

However, Morogo's parents have learned about their disappearances and inform Ted and Susan's parents. Earl calls his mother and she informs him about the telegram the siblings sent to her. The parents call the police and their wives insist on heading out to find the children themselves. Meanwhile, the children arrive at the camp and sneak in at nightfall. They manage to find Duma, but are captured by the poachers and locked in a cage. While they leave for the race, Morogo unlocks the cage and they head after the poachers to Nairobi.

They head off after the poachers to Nairobi, only to be caught by the policemen roaming the roads for them. They escape, due to the inattentiveness of the policeman and finally make it to Nairobi with the help of a sheep farmer. The children reach the racetrack in time to hear the cheetah-greyhound race being announced. In the race, Duma has now been overtaken by greyhounds, with greater resistance (as predicted by Patel, who had given up losing in bets) but is revived in reviewing his masters and resumed to race winning. Ted grabs his whistle from a security guard and blows it, allowing Duma to regain her burst of speed and win. While the other gamblers must compensate all bets, Duma rebels against Abdullah and attacks him until she is rescued by Earl. While both sets of parents berate their children for leaving them, the poacher is arrested.

The families arrive at Cheetah Valley to release Duma and notice another cheetah. They refuse to extend their parents' proposal for the holiday and they try to release Duma, but the stubborn cheetah refuses to leave until Susan manages to convince her to leave. The children quote a Kenyan adage by Morogo "Though we are far apart, our spirits share the same earth and the same sky" as they happily watch Duma play with her newfound friend.

Cast
 Keith Coogan as Ted Johnson
 Lucy Deakins as Susan Johnson
 Collin Mothupi as Morogo
 Timothy Landfield as Earl Johnson
 Breon Gorman-Landfield as Jean Johnson
 Mhlangabezi Ka Vundla as Kipoin
 Lydia Kigada as Lani
 Kuldeep Bhakoo as Mr. Patel
 Paul Onsongo as Abdullah
 Anthony Baird as Nigel
 Rory McGuinness as Larry
 Rod Jacobsen as David
 David Adido as Mwangi
 Konga Mbandu as Police Captain
 Martin Okello as Friendly Policeman
 Allaudin Qureshi as Patel's Cousin
 William Tsuma as Cabbie
 Waigwa Wachira as Racetrack Policeman
 Jim Ward as Announcer
 Jan MacCoy as Stewardess
 Evalyne Kamau as Nyambura
 Jane Gelardi as Announcer's Girlfriend
 'J.J.' Joseph Otieno Adamson as Blue Duka Band Member 1
 David Otieno as Blue Duka Band Member 2
 Wally Amalemba as Blue Duka Band Member 3
 Tony Evans Kalanzi as Blue Duka Band Member 4
 Kelly Harry Ngetsa as Blue Duka Band Member 5
 Thomas Akare as Bettor 1
 Denis Doughty as Bettor 2
 Siddik Ebrahim as Bettor 3
 Lee Harvin as Bettor 4
 Aloysius Lazarus as Greyhound Owner 1
 Njoroge Ngoima as Greyhound Owner 2
 Frank Turner as Greyhound Owner 3
 Richard Clarke as Announcer (voice)
 Michael Rogers as Racetrack Policeman (voice)

Crewman Joe Herrington provided the vocalization of Duma.

See also
Born Free (1966)
A Far Off Place (1993)
Duma (2005)
The Last Lions (2011)
African Cats (2011)

References

External links
 

1989 films
1989 crime drama films
American children's films
American drama films
Films based on British novels
Films set in Kenya
Films shot in Kenya
Walt Disney Pictures films
1989 directorial debut films
Films about cheetahs
Films about siblings
Films produced by Roy E. Disney
1980s English-language films
1980s American films